The Bellarmine Knights Men's Lacrosse team is a college lacrosse team that represents Bellarmine University in Louisville, Kentucky, United States. The school has been an all-sports member of the ASUN Conference since 2020, but men's lacrosse spent the 2021 season (2020–21 school year) as an associate member of the Southern Conference (SoCon), in which it had competed since the 2015 season. With the reinstatement of ASUN men's lacrosse competition for the 2022 season, Bellarmine moved that sport to its full-time conference home.

Jack McGetrick helped found the Bellarmine Knights lacrosse program in 2004 in anticipation of starting competition in the spring of 2005. He was head coach of the program until he lost his long battle with cancer in October 2010.

In July 2019, Bellarmine University's athletic department named Andrew Whitley the next head coach of the Knights men's lacrosse program.

The revival of ASUN men's lacrosse saw the two full ASUN members with men's lacrosse programs separate, with Bellarmine moving to the ASUN while Jacksonville remained in the SoCon. The Knights were joined in the revived ASUN league by five new associate members—Air Force, Cleveland State, Detroit Mercy, Robert Morris, and Utah.

History

Conference affiliations
 Independent (2005-2006)
 GWLL (2007-2009) 
 ECAC (2010-2014)
 SoCon (2015–2021)
 ASUN (2022–present)

Year by year results

* Jay Sothoron was named the interim head coach with 2 games remaining in the 2018 season.

All-time coaching records

References

External links